Guy Marchoul (born 4 November 1965 in Anderlecht) is a former Belgian footballer who played as right back or central defender.

Honours

Player

Anderlecht 
 Belgian First Division: 1985–86, 1986–87, 1990–91, 1992–93, 1993–94
 Belgian Cup: 1987–88, 1988–89, 1993–94
 Belgian Super Cup: 1985, 1987, 1993
 European Cup Winners' Cup: 1989-90 (runners-up)

References 

1965 births
Living people
R.S.C. Anderlecht players
Belgian footballers
Association football defenders
Lierse S.K. players
S.C. Eendracht Aalst players